The Stotler Formation is a geological formation in Nebraska. It preserves fossils dating back to the Carboniferous period.

See also

 List of fossiliferous stratigraphic units in Nebraska
 Paleontology in Nebraska
 Paleontology

References
 

Carboniferous geology of Nebraska
Carboniferous Kansas
Carboniferous southern paleotropical deposits